Miltonia cuneata, the wedge-shaped miltonia, is a species of orchid endemic to southeastern Brazil.
Found in Brazil at elevations around 800 to 1000 meters in dense, wet montane forests as a robust, medium sized, creeping, warm to cool growing epiphyte with slightly tapered, slightly flattened pseudobulbs that can be clustered or well spaced and are enveloped basally by 2 to 4 non-foliaceous sheaths and carry 2 to 3, narrow, acute leaves that blooms in the winter and early spring on a erect or arching, to 2' [60 cm] long, few to several [5 to 8] flowered inflorescence with triangular, acute, papery bracts.

References

External links 

cuneata
Endemic orchids of Brazil
Flora of the Atlantic Forest